Cesar Adonis Brito González (born 10 May 1999) is a Dominican Republic badminton player. In 2016, he won bronze medal at the Pan Am Junior Badminton Championships in mixed doubles event with his partner Nairoby Abigail Jimenez. He competed at the 2018 Central American and Caribbean Games and clinched the bronze medal in the men's doubles event partnered with Reymi Cabreras.

Achievements

Central American and Caribbean Games 
Men's doubles

BWF International Challenge/Series 
Men's singles

Mixed doubles

  BWF International Challenge tournament
  BWF International Series tournament
  BWF Future Series tournament

References

External links 
 

1999 births
Living people
Dominican Republic male badminton players
Badminton players at the 2019 Pan American Games
Pan American Games competitors for the Dominican Republic
Central American and Caribbean Games bronze medalists for the Dominican Republic
Competitors at the 2018 Central American and Caribbean Games
Central American and Caribbean Games medalists in badminton
20th-century Dominican Republic people
21st-century Dominican Republic people